Godeau is a French surname. Notable people with the surname include:

Antoine Godeau (1605–1672), French bishop, poet and exegete
Bruno Godeau (born 1992), Belgian footballer
Philippe Godeau, French film producer, director and screenwriter

French-language surnames